Fife Heritage Railway is a heritage railway run by The Kingdom of Fife Railway Preservation Society, formed in 1992, which aims to showcase the heritage of the railways of Fife and restore locomotives and rolling stock that once worked in Fife. They are based in Levenmouth, Scotland which has been their base since 2003.

Overview
Following the closure of the Lochty Private Railway in 1992 due to falling guest numbers and increased public liability premiums, the Kingdom of Fife Railway Preservation Society was quickly formed in May of that year to take over the former Lochty fleet and find a new home for them. In 1994, the last of the fleet was moved from Lochty to the now defunct Methil Power Station until the society could find a permanent home for its collection.

Various locations around Fife were looked at which included the former Crail Aerodrome, Lochore Meadows, Bowhill Colliery, part of the former Auctertool branch line, the former Wemyss Private Railway site at Scott's Road and even the former Kilconquhar railway station, all of which proved unsuitable for various reasons. In 2001 the society acquired the former Kirkland railway marshalling yard on the outskirts of Leven and in 2003, the rolling stock were moved from the Power Station to their new home. Since then the KFRPS have constructed half a mile of track plus substantial sidings, along with a two-track engine shed which is used for restoration work.

In 2016 the Fife Heritage Railway fired the first steam engine to run on a Fife heritage line since the closure of Lochty in 1992. Forth gained its boiler certificate in August which will run until 2020 when it is due for overhaul, after a brief "running in" period, Forth was brought into service during the last days of the 2016 working season. Painted in Wemyss Coal Company livery to match sister locomotives that once worked in the area, an official renaming ceremony was carried out at the start of the 2017 season by clan chief Michael Wemyss.

Rolling Stock
With the society's purpose of preserving locomotives and rolling stock that either worked in Fife or have a Fife connection of some kind, the society uniquely, in its certain location, has the status of having its collection being based in a fifteen-mile radius of where they were first working during their early days in Fife.

Future Plans
The current object for the society is raise its profile by introducing steam trains on their current branch along with Kirkland built up as a museum for Fife's railway heritage which looks to include a display building to be built in the not too distant future, along with a second steam locomotive. Work has started to restore a second steam locomotive to work alongside the current working locomotive, Forth. With recent developments of the reopening of the Levenmouth rail link to take place within the next few years, the society hope to become a larger tourist attraction for the Levenmouth area and Fife as a whole.

References

External links
 Website
 Visit Scotland

Heritage railways in Scotland
1992 establishments in Scotland
Tourist attractions in Fife